Nathalie Desmares  (born 18 May 1972) is a French snowboarder. 

She was born in L'Aigle. She competed at the 1998 Winter Olympics in Nagano, in women's giant slalom, and she competed at the 2010 Winter Olympics in Vancouver, in women's parallel giant slalom.

Desmares competed in the Parallel giant slalom with Sylvain Dufour as a partner in 2018.

References

External links 
 

1972 births
Living people
Sportspeople from Orne
French female snowboarders
Olympic snowboarders of France
Snowboarders at the 1998 Winter Olympics
Snowboarders at the 2010 Winter Olympics
21st-century French women